Medomsley is a village in County Durham, England, about  northeast of the centre of Consett,  south of Hamsterley and  southeast of Ebchester.

The village has views of the Pennines and the surrounding countryside for miles around.

Toponym
The Boldon Book of 1183 records Medomsley as Medomesley. The Vita S Godrici, written in 1190, records it as Madmeslei. The placename is derived from Old English and may mean the “middlemost clearing” or “Maethhelm’s clearing”.

Parish church

The Church of England parish church of St Mary Magdalene is a sandstone building completed in the 13th century. In 1878 it was restored to designs by the architects HJ Austin, RJ Johnson and WS Hicks, who added a new roof, chancel screen (designed by Hicks) and north aisle. It is a Grade I listed building.

Medomsley's church served many inhabitants of Shotley Bridge for baptisms, marriages and burials until the creation of Shotley Bridge parish in the 19th century. The sword-makers of Shotley Bridge were frequent visitors of the church, and the parish registers record many of these events.

Notable people
The antiquarian and physician Christopher Hunter (1675–1757) was born at Medomsley Hall.

Coal mining
There were two collieries near the village: Medomsley Colliery southwest of the village and Derwent Colliery immediately to the north. Medomsley Colliery was opened in 1839. It was also known as the Busty pit, and is not to be confused with South Medomsley Colliery near Annfield Plain. Derwent Colliery was opened in 1856.

Both pits were opened by Edward Richardson and Co. The Consett Iron Company took them over in the 1860s. They were nationalised in 1947.

Coal left the two pits by rail. A  freight-only railway ran south from Derwent Colliery via Medomsley Colliery to a junction west of Leadgate, where it joined the Stanhope and Tyne line of the North Eastern Railway.

There were several mining accidents at the pits. One in 1923 killed eight miners. In 1957, in another accident, two miners were rescued uninjured.

The National Coal Board closed Derwent Colliery in 1964 and Medomsley Colliery in 1972. It proposed opencast coal mining near Medomsley, but in 1976 the Secretary of State for Energy, Tony Benn, rejected the proposal.

Amenities

Scheduled bus services link Medomsley with Consett and Newcastle upon Tyne.

Medomsley has a cricket club, at High Westwood, that was founded in 1926.

Youth detention centres

Hassockfield youth detention centre is on a  site on the edge of Medomsley.

Medomsley Detention Centre

The site was previously Medomsley Detention Centre, where some staff sexually and physically abused thousands of boys in the 1970s and 80s. In 1988 the centre closed after the scandal of the paedophile officer Neville Husband.

Hassockfield detention centre
The centre was re-opened in 1999. In 2004 Adam Rickwood, a resident of Hassockfield, committed suicide. After this incident Hassockfield improved its performance, but it was closed again in 2015.

References

Bibliography

External links

Villages in County Durham
Consett